Fissurella costata, common name : the costate keyhole limpet, is a species of sea snail, a marine gastropod mollusk in the family Fissurellidae, the keyhole limpets.

Description
The size of an adult shell varies between 25 mm and 90 mm.

Distribution
This species occurs in the Pacific Ocean off Peru and Chile.

References

External links
  McLean J.H. (1984) Systematics of Fissurella in the Peruvian and Magellanic faunal provinces (Gastropoda: Prosobranchia). Contributions in Science, Natural History Museum of Los Angeles County 354: 1–70, p. 49. (29 October 1984) 
 

Fissurellidae
Gastropods described in 1831
Invertebrates of Chile
Invertebrates of Peru
Taxa named by René Lesson